In Greek mythology, Antiope  or Antiopa (Ancient Greek: Ἀντιόπη derived from αντι anti "against, compared to, like" and οψ ops "voice" or means "confronting") may refer to the following

 Antiope, daughter of King Belus of Egypt and possibly, Achiroe, naiad daughter of the river-god Nilus. She was the sister of Agenor II, Phineus,  Aegyptus, Danaus, Cepheus and Ninus. By her uncle, King Agenor I of Tyre, Antiope became the mother of Cadmus and his siblings. In some accounts, this daughter of Belus was called Damno.
Antiope, daughter of Aeolus, by whom Poseidon begot Boeotus and Hellen (Aeolus). She was also called Arne or Melanippe, in some accounts.
Antiope, nymph of Pieria and the mother, by Pierus, of the Pierides, nine sisters who challenged the muses and, on their defeat, were turned into birds.
Antiope, consort of Helios and possible mother of Aeetes and Aloeus.
 Antiope, sister of Hippolyte, kidnapped by Theseus during Heracles' ninth labour.
 Antiope, mother of Amphion by Zeus, associated with the mythology of Thebes, Greece.
 Antiope, also called Antioche, daughter of Pylon and wife of Eurytus.
 Antiope, a Thespian princess as one of the 50 daughters of King Thespius and Megamede or by one of his many wives. When Heracles hunted and ultimately slayed the Cithaeronian lion, Antiope with her other sisters, except for one, all laid with the hero in a night, a week or for 50 days as what their father strongly desired it to be. Antiope bore Heracles a son, Alopius.
 Antiope, wife of Laocoön.

Notes

References 

 Apollodorus, The Library with an English Translation by Sir James George Frazer, F.B.A., F.R.S. in 2 Volumes, Cambridge, MA, Harvard University Press; London, William Heinemann Ltd. 1921. ISBN 0-674-99135-4. Online version at the Perseus Digital Library. Greek text available from the same website.
Apollonius Rhodius, Argonautica translated by Robert Cooper Seaton (1853-1915), R. C. Loeb Classical Library Volume 001. London, William Heinemann Ltd, 1912. Online version at the Topos Text Project.
 Apollonius Rhodius, Argonautica. George W. Mooney. London. Longmans, Green. 1912. Greek text available at the Perseus Digital Library.

 Athenaeus of Naucratis, The Deipnosophists or Banquet of the Learned. London. Henry G. Bohn, York Street, Covent Garden. 1854. Online version at the Perseus Digital Library.
 Athenaeus of Naucratis, Deipnosophistae. Kaibel. In Aedibus B.G. Teubneri. Lipsiae. 1887. Greek text available at the Perseus Digital Library.

Diodorus Siculus, The Library of History translated by Charles Henry Oldfather. Twelve volumes. Loeb Classical Library. Cambridge, Massachusetts: Harvard University Press; London: William Heinemann, Ltd. 1989. Vol. 3. Books 4.59–8. Online version at Bill Thayer's Web Site
Diodorus Siculus, Bibliotheca Historica. Vol 1-2. Immanel Bekker. Ludwig Dindorf. Friedrich Vogel. in aedibus B. G. Teubneri. Leipzig. 1888-1890. Greek text available at the Perseus Digital Library.
Gaius Julius Hyginus, Fabulae from The Myths of Hyginus translated and edited by Mary Grant. University of Kansas Publications in Humanistic Studies. Online version at the Topos Text Project.
 Homer, The Odyssey with an English Translation by A.T. Murray, PH.D. in two volumes. Cambridge, MA., Harvard University Press; London, William Heinemann, Ltd. 1919. Online version at the Perseus Digital Library. Greek text available from the same website.

 Marcus Tullius Cicero, Nature of the Gods from the Treatises of M.T. Cicero translated by Charles Duke Yonge (1812-1891), Bohn edition of 1878. Online version at the Topos Text Project.
 Marcus Tullius Cicero, De Natura Deorum. O. Plasberg. Leipzig. Teubner. 1917.  Latin text available at the Perseus Digital Library.

 Pausanias, Description of Greece with an English Translation by W.H.S. Jones, Litt.D., and H.A. Ormerod, M.A., in 4 Volumes. Cambridge, MA, Harvard University Press; London, William Heinemann Ltd. 1918. . Online version at the Perseus Digital Library
 Pausanias, Graeciae Descriptio. 3 vols. Leipzig, Teubner. 1903.  Greek text available at the Perseus Digital Library.
 Tzetzes, John, Book of Histories, Book II-IV translated by Gary Berkowitz from the original Greek of T. Kiessling's edition of 1826. Online version at theio.com 
Tzetzes, John, Book of Histories, Book VII-VIII translated by Vasiliki Dogani from the original Greek of T. Kiessling's edition of 1826. Online version at theio.com

Princesses in Greek mythology
Queens in Greek mythology
Egyptian characters in Greek mythology
Women of Heracles